Xidu Town is a town and the seat of Hengyang County in Hunan, China. It has 22 villages and 13 communities under its jurisdiction, its seat is Huaihua Community.

History
The name of Xidu Town may have been first recorded in Yuanfeng Jiuyu Zhi (a geographical book by Wang Cun) in the Northern Song dynasty. It means crossing the river to the west. Going west to Baoqing (modern Shaoyang) from Hengzhou (modern Hengyang) via the Zheng River in the past, it was named after that. It is Located on the western bank of Zheng River. After Hengnan County was reformed from a part of the county of Hengyang, its seat was moved to the town from the north of Hengyang (the modern Shigu District) in July 1952.

Subdivision
The town of Xidu had 61 villages and 9 communities at its establishment in 2015. Its divisions were reduced to 35 from 70 through the amalgamation of villages in 2016, it has 22 villages and 13 communities under its jurisdiction.

22 villages
 Bao'an Village
 Chishui Village
 Doupo Village
 Duling Village
 Fuxing Village
 Huanglin Village
 Meihua Village
 Meizhu Village
 Panlong Village
 Qingjiang Village
 Qingli Village
 Qingping Village
 Qiutang Village
 Tianxing Village
 Tongqiao Village
 Xianshui Village
 Xianzhongwu Village
 Xiaohai Village
 Xidu Village
 Xinqiao Village
 Yingnan Village
 Zhenxing Village

13 communities
 Bao'an community
 Binjiang Community
 Chunfeng community
 Haotang Community
 Huaihua Community
 Jiangkou Community
 Jiangshan Community
 Minghan Community
 Mizi Community
 Sanlian Community
 Yanggu Community
 Yingpo Community
 Zhenyang Community

References

External links
 Official Website

Hengyang County
County seats in Hunan
Towns of Hunan